Ellenbrook railway station may refer to:

 Ellenbrook railway station, Perth
 Ellenbrook railway station, Worsley